In Greek mythology, Edonus was the ancestor of the Edonians in Thrace and Thracian Macedonia. He was the son of Ares (god of war) and Calliope (muse of epic poetry). The names Edonus, Edonian, Edonic is therefore used also in the sense of "Thracian", and as Thrace was one of the principal seats of the worship of Dionysus, it further signifies "Dionysiac" or "Bacchantic".

Notes

References 

 Stephanus of Byzantium, Stephani Byzantii Ethnicorum quae supersunt, edited by August Meineike (1790-1870), published 1849. A few entries from this important ancient handbook of place names have been translated by Brady Kiesling. Online version at the Topos Text Project.

Children of Ares
Demigods in classical mythology
Dionysus in mythology
Thraco-Macedonian mythology